The 1999 Tunbridge Wells Borough Council election took place on 6 May 1999 to elect members of Tunbridge Wells Borough Council in Kent, England. One third of the council was up for election and the Conservative party stayed in overall control of the council.

After the election, the composition of the council was
Conservative 28
Liberal Democrat 12
Labour 7
Independent 1

Results

References

1999 English local elections
1999
1990s in Kent